William Berry Hartsfield Sr. (March 1, 1890 – February 22, 1971), was an American politician who served as the 49th and 51st Mayor of Atlanta, Georgia. His tenure extended from 1937 to 1941 and again from 1942 to 1962, making him the longest-serving mayor of his native Atlanta, Georgia.

Early career 
Hartsfield worked as a clerk while reading law for the law firm of Rosser, Brandon, Slaton & Phillips beginning in 1916. Hartsfield entered politics in 1922 by winning a city alderman seat. He served two terms in the Georgia House of Representatives during the 1930s.

Mayor of Atlanta 
William B. Hartsfield was first elected Mayor of Atlanta in January 1937. Upon taking office, the city was $3 million in debt, due to the Great Depression. Hartsfield quickly turned around the city's finances, but lost re-election in 1940. The man who defeated Hartsfield, Roy LeCraw, served just one year as mayor, before being drafted into the United States Army. Hartsfield won election in 1941, and remained in office until 1961.

Biographer Harold Martin described Hartsfield as "a man fanatically addicted to the media." By the mid-1950s, he owned eight radios, three television sets, a combination radio-phonograph, a high-fidelity record player, a wire recorder, and a tape recorder. "This way," Hartsfield told an interviewer, "I can keep up all the time with what's going on in Atlanta and all the world. I tell people I'm an electronic mayor. Actually, I'm just a gadget bug."

In an obituary for him, the New York Times credited Hartsfield with developing Atlanta into a national aviation center. He was lauded by the Upper Chattahoochee Development Association in 1957 for his work in promoting the Buford Dam. The dam helped create a source of water, Lake Lanier for the Atlanta metropolitan area.

Hartsfield received an honorary degree in Doctor of Laws from Oglethorpe University in 1961.

Race 
The New York Times called Hartsfield a "racial moderate," highlighting his slogan "Atlanta is a city too busy to hate," which he often repeated during the civil rights struggles of the 1950s. In 1957, he won election to his last term as mayor by defeating the staunch segregationist and future Governor Lester Maddox.

Before Christmas 1955, Hartsfield ordered Atlanta's city golf courses be opened to Black golfers.

Throughout much of the 1940s, Hartsfield pushed for Atlanta to annex a number of predominantly white suburbs, fearing that Atlanta's "Negro population is growing by leaps and bounds," resulting in the loss of "white territory inside Atlanta," and hoped that the inclusion of these suburbs would prevent the city's black population from becoming a "potent political force in Atlanta." While residents of these suburbs rejected annexation in a 1947 referendum, legislation was passed which annexed these communities in 1952, tripling Atlanta's area, and adding 100,000 new residents to the city.

Legacy 
Willie B., a gorilla that became a popular attraction at Zoo Atlanta for decades, was named for Hartsfield.

Hartsfield–Jackson Atlanta International Airport is named in Hartsfield's honor as well as a later mayor, Maynard Jackson, who led the modernization of the airport in the 1970s.

References

Charlie Brown Remembers Atlanta (1982), Charles M. Brown, R. L. Bryan Company
Williams, Louis. 2002. "William B. Hartsfield (1890-1971)". New Georgia Encyclopedia. Georgia Humanities Council.

External links
New Georgia Encyclopedia, Biography
Stuart A. Rose Manuscript, Archives, and Rare Book Library, Emory University: William Berry Hartsfield papers, circa 1860s-1983

Further reading
 

1890 births
1971 deaths
Georgia (U.S. state) lawyers
Democratic Party members of the Georgia House of Representatives
Mayors of Atlanta
20th-century American politicians
20th-century American lawyers